
Gmina Łubianka is a rural gmina (administrative district) in Toruń County, Kuyavian-Pomeranian Voivodeship, in north-central Poland.

Villages
Gmina Łubianka contains the villages and settlements of Bierzgłowo, Biskupice, Brąchnowo, Dębiny, Leszcz, Łubianka, Pigża, Przeczno, Słomowo, Warszewice, Wybcz, Wybczyk, Wymysłowo and Zamek Bierzgłowski.

Neighbouring gminas
Gmina Łubianka is bordered by the gminas of Chełmża, Kijewo Królewskie, Łysomice, Unisław and Zławieś Wielka.

References
Polish official population figures 2006

Lubianka
Toruń County